The Guabo is a canton in the province of El Oro in Ecuador. Its capital is the city cantonal Guabo. Its population in the 2010 census was 50,009 inhabitants.
The date of canton of El Guabo was September 7, 1978. The mayor for the period 2009-2014 was John Franco Aguilar.

Geographic Location
The Guabo is located northwest of the province of El Oro, has an area of 498km2, at a distance of 18 km from Machala capital of the province. To the north the canton Orangery (Canton) , south to the cantons Machala and Passage (Canton), east to the Canton Ponce Enriquez and Passage (Canton) , and west by the Pacific Ocean, Gulf of Guayaquil.
The canton is located in the coastal region with a tropical humid climate, in which the most important crop is bananas for export.

Demographics
Ethnic groups as of the Ecuadorian census of 2010:
Mestizo  82.3%
Afro-Ecuadorian  6.9%
White  6.0%
Montubio  4.0%
Indigenous  0.7%
Other  0.2%

History

It arises as a village between 1700 and 1750 in the rain forest of the south-west of the country and north of what is now the province gold, bounded by a river on the left bank doublets, covered by the leafy robust guaba that gave its name to become the end of 1920 in the small commercial river traffic point, in 1882 the manor liberal parish since 1978 illustrious canton in the open door of the late twentieth century.
The time schedule takes us to the year 1977, which was for the progressive and then parish Guabo, the beginning of his "off" to what it meant for the life and soul of this always virile and fighter, achieving cantonización persevering quest for happily given at the beginning of September 7, 1978.

Sources
Tradition has it that back in the 1700s and 1750s, when our Indians conquered by the Spanish, from the salty family and balao (Guayas) settled on the left bank of the river doublets, about 23 km., In its channel output Sea Jambelí balboa, with materials donated by the nature built ranches and gradually formed a village. until the early 1930s, the river, as expressed in data collected by journalist and professor arnulfo carvallo, had his tour of what a few years ago called "The Beach" (now av. army) and that once changed course and abandoned its bed drying led to the settlement and creation of sites and neighborhoods like victory, santa cruz, the pleasure, the hill, June 5, the office, Lt.. gustavo ledesma, July 3, April 30, January 20 and intake; holding that version took its present course doublets in Christmas 1924. On the bank of the river, from a variety of gigantic trees protruded from "guabas machete," that lamb palaces say in his book "the Canari and Inca Canaris" among the trees of cultivated land must call guabos and give guabas which is a very tasty fruit whose trunk had to be taken to tie the canoes and small sloops, river transportation only means the time by which the products were extracted from the area to the mouth of doublets in the Pacific, bound for Guayaquil.
To reach the former village of Guayaquil, had to do on that boat transshipment mouth, close under high, where they performed "reestibaba" load another larger vessels called sloops because they were too fragile canoes to navigate sea crossing, especially at the mouth Jambelí channel to open sea, opposite the island of Puna.
Although there were a variety of fruit trees, cocoa and coffee accounted for the greatest wealth, they were transported by mule sometimes even faster were the canoes, to the right side of the mouth of the river doublets.
As necessity is the mother of invention, settled families began building their propis ranches near the awnings in order to take care of you left to dry products. construction of these ranches was such that with the passage of time is built into a major river and sea port, as well as serve to trade with large-scale guayaquil.
In these circumstances there is the tacky dialogue montubios canoeists, when river traffic were among wondered if, in these cases they were leaving or arriving, saying one to another:
Where are you going?
the "guabo". Bring more cocoa and coffee
How about you?
I'm pa "awnings", leading people to be guayaquil other. I return to "guabo" taking fish 'low-high.
The robust Guabo that tree was planted where the streets are currently 3 November and the army Avenue (neighborhood July 3), raised very close to the precipice of doublets and around which the early settled families from balao. the trunk of the tree and tie Adocar served for canoes and rafts, which the mouth of under high reached the "guabo" and went up the river to the town of passage often transporting cocoa, coffee other products from the area, the main essence of trade of the time in its output to guayaquil, always under high.
It adds that the awnings were the huge dryers which tended the "gold nugget" and coffee. These awnings constructed of bamboo cane wax, the banks of the river to enjoy the sun and sea breeze.
The vulgar dialogue was repeated every day and every moment, emerging from the supreme nature of our field men of the sister "the guabo" and "awnings" as etymological genesis of our history in which the river is essential irrefutable doublets .

Political division
The Guabo is divided into five parishes:
The Guabo (cantonal)
Bourbons (Sucre)
The Iberia
Tendales (heads in Puerto Tendales)
Rio Bonito
Works of Mr. John Franco called: The Linear Park course is not a straight line.

External links
 Autonomous Provincial Government Gold
 The Municipal Government Guabo

Guabo Colleges
 National Joint College Dr. Jose Maria Velasco Ibarra
 National Joint College Dr. Jose Miguel Garcia Moreno
 College Night "The Guabo"
 Latin American Private College
 Mora Private College Quinonez
 Ati II Private College Pillahuaso

References

Cantons of El Oro Province